The New Left Movement (Spanish: Movimiento Nueva Izquierda) is a Peruvian political party. At the legislative elections held on  9 April 2006, the party won 1.2% of the popular vote but no seats in the Congress of the Republic. The party ran Alberto Moreno for the presidency in 2006 gaining 0.3% of the popular vote.

Political parties in Peru
Socialist parties in Peru